This is a list of supermarket chains in Cameroon.
 Casino Supermarkets
 DOVV Distribution
 Eco Marché
 Ecoprix
 Le Bon Point
 Leader Price
 Mahima Supermarkets
 Carrefour
 Super U
 Spar
 Santa Lucia
 Bel Achat
 Bonus

See also
 List of supermarket chains in Africa
 List of supermarket chains

References

Cameroon

Economy of Cameroon
Supermarket chains
Cameroon